Matthew Smiley (born October 2, 1978) is an American football coach who is the special teams coordinator for the Buffalo Bills of the National Football League (NFL).

Career
From 2013 to 2016, Smiley was the assistant special teams coordinator for the Jacksonville Jaguars.

Smiley joined the Bills in 2017 as assistant special teams coordinator when Sean McDermott was hired as head coach in 2017, and held that post for five years. During that time, kicker Tyler Bass scored 141 points in 2020 and 135 in 2021.

References

Living people
Buffalo Bills coaches
Year of birth missing (living people)